Amthor is a surname of:

 Carl Ernst August Amthor (1845–1916), German headmaster, solved the Archimedes's cattle problem 
Christoph Heinrich Amthor (1677–1721), German poet and translator of the Baroque
Eduard Gottlieb Amthor (1820–1884), German bookseller and school director 
Ehrenfried Amthor (1638–1696), senior administrative officer in the Danish army 
Joachim Ulrich Amthor (1631–1694), Countess-Stolberg Hofrat, Chancellor and Director of the Consistory in Stolberg
Philipp Amthor (born 1992), German politician (CDU)
 Terry K. Amthor (born 1958), American game designer

 William Amthor, founder of Cost Plus World Market